Sebastian Harnisch (born 3 February 1967  in Germany) is Professor of International Relations and Foreign Policy at the Faculty of Economic and Social Sciences of the University of Heidelberg.

Education
 2004 Habilitation (Political Science), University of Trier
 1998 Dr. Phil. (Political Science), University of Trier
 1993 M.A. (Political Science, History), University of Trier
 1990–1991 Graduate Studies (Diplomacy), Georgetown University, Washington DC, Exchange Year

Career
Harnisch is currently Professor of Political Science with Special Reference to International Politics at the University of Heidelberg and was previously Assistant and Junior Professor at the University of Trier, Germany. He has also held a visiting fellowship at the Seoul National University, South Korea. His research and publications encompass German and American Foreign Policy, European affairs, theories of International Relations, non-proliferation of weapons of mass destruction and Korean Affairs. Sebastian Harnisch is also Co-Editor of the Online-Newsletter and E-Monograph series of www.deutsche-aussenpolitik.de.

Books and edited volumes (selection)
  Außenpolitischer Strukturwandel in der Bundesrepublik Deutschland, Baden-Baden: Nomos Verlag (in preparation).
 Internationale Politik und Verfassung. Zur Domestizierung des sicherheits- und europapolitischen Prozesses der Bundesrepublik Deutschland, Baden-Baden: Nomos- Verlag, 2006.
 (ed.)Deutsche Sicherheitspolitik. Eine Bilanz der Regierung Schröder, Baden-Baden: Nomos Verlag, 2004 (with Christos Katsioulis und Marco Overhaus).
 (ed.) Deutschland im Abseits? Rot-grüne Außenpolitik 1998–2003, Baden-Baden: Nomos Verlag, 2003 (with Hanns W. Maull and Constantin Grund).
 (ed.) Germany as a Civilian Power. The Foreign Policy of the Berlin Republic, Manchester: Manchester University Press, 2001 (with Hanns W. Maull).
 Außenpolitisches Lernen. Die US-Außenpolitik auf der koreanischen Halbinsel, Opladen: Leske & Budrich, 2000.
 Kernwaffen in Nordkorea. Regionale Stabilität und Krisenmanagement durch das Genfer Rahmenabkommen (Forschungsinstitut der DGAP), Bonn: Europa Union Verlag, 2000 (with Hanns W. Maull).
 Europa und Amerika. Die US-amerikanische Haltung zur westeuropäischen Integration 1987–1994, Sinzheim: Pro Universitate Verlag 1996.

Articles
 Das Proliferationsnetzwerk um A. Q. Khan, in: Aus Politik und Zeitgeschichte, Vol 48 (2005), S. 1–8.
 (K)ein Bluff wie jeder andere. Nordkoreas nukleares Bekenntnis muss ernst genommen werden, in: Internationale Politik 60 (2005) 3, pp. 104–107.
 German Non-Proliferation Policy and the Iraq Conflict, in: German Politics 13 (2004) 2, pp. 1–34.
 Die ZIB als Forum der deutschen IB? Eine kritische Bestandsaufnahme, in: Zeitschrift für Internationale Beziehungen 11 (2004) 2, pp. 357–364 (with Hanns W. Maull and Siegfried Schieder).
 Transatlantische Kooperation tut Not. Europa, die USA und die Massenvernichtungswaffen, in: Internationale Politik 59 (2004) 1, pp. 19–25.
 US-DPRK Relations under the Bush Administration: From „go slow“ to „no go“, in: Asian Survey 42 (2002) 6, pp. 856–882.
 Embedding Korea’s Unification Multilaterally, in: Pacific Review 15 (2002) 1, pp. 29–62 (with Hanns W. Maull).
 Change and Continuity in Post-Unification German Foreign Policy, in: German Politics 10 (2001) 1, pp. 35–60.

References

German political scientists
Academic staff of Heidelberg University
1967 births
Living people